The following is an initial list of notable festschrifts:

See also
 Lists of books

Lists of books by type
Lists of monuments and memorials by type